Radical 195 or radical fish meaning "fish" is one of the 6 Kangxi radicals (214 radicals in total) composed of 11 strokes.

In the Kangxi Dictionary, there are 571 characters (out of 49,030) to be found under this radical.

Evolution

Derived characters

Literature

References

External links

Unihan Database - U+9B5A

195
177